Siaqul-e Sofla (also Romanized as Sīāqūl-e Soflá; also known as Sīāh Gol-e Pā’īn) is a village in Mangur-e Sharqi Rural District, Khalifan District, Mahabad County, West Azerbaijan Province, Iran. At the 2006 census, its population was 142, in 22 families.

References 

Populated places in Mahabad County